Vice Admiral Sir Nicholas William Hine,  (born 4 February 1966) is a retired senior Royal Navy officer. He served as Second Sea Lord from 2019 to 2022.

Early life and education
Hine was born on 4 February 1966 in Carlisle, Cumberland, England. He was educated at John Taylor High School, a state school in Staffordshire. He studied at City University London (Bachelor of Science, 1989) and King's College London (Master of Arts Defence Studies, 1999).

Naval career
Hine joined the Royal Navy in 1985. He served as commanding officer of HMS Blackwater from 1995 to 1997, and as Executive Officer of HMS Splendid from 1999 to 2000.

He became Assistant Director of the Maritime Change Programme in August 2007, Director Iraq Maritime and Training in January 2009 and Team Leader Warfare Officers and Ratings in August 2010. He went on to be Head of Anti-Submarine Warfare and commanding officer of the frigate  in June 2011, conducting numerous counter piracy and drug missions in the Gulf and East Africa. Defence Policy Advisor to HM Treasury in September 2012 and Assistant Chief of the Naval Staff (Policy) in September 2015. During his time in the role he authored the Maritime Strategy 2035.

Hine became Second Sea Lord on 26 April 2019, and was promoted to vice admiral.  As Second Sea Lord he was responsible for the 'Navy Transformation' programme. He also chaired the Royal Navy Digital and Data Board. On 12 January 2022, Hine was succeeded by Vice Admiral Martin Connell as Second Sea Lord. He retired from the Royal Navy on 5 May 2022.

In 2015, Hine was given permission to wear the Bronze Star Medal awarded to him by the President of the United States "in recognition of meritorious, gallant and distinguished services during coalition operations in Iraq". In the 2018 Queen's Birthday Honours, he was appointed a Companion of the Order of the Bath (CB).

Hine was appointed Knight Commander of the Order of the Bath (KCB) in the 2023 New Year Honours.

Personal life
Hine is married and has one daughter.

Hine was diagnosed with autism in the 2010s, and has spoken in favour of neurodiversity in the armed forces.

The 1999 BBC1 documentary "Splendid Under The Sea" followed Hine as Second in Command.

References

|-

1966 births
Living people
Military personnel from Cumberland
Alumni of City, University of London
Alumni of King's College London
Knights Commander of the Order of the Bath
Foreign recipients of United States military awards and decorations
People from Carlisle, Cumbria
Royal Navy vice admirals
Royal Navy personnel of the Iraq War
People on the autism spectrum